Visa Paralympic Hall of Fame is a hall of fame which was established by the International Paralympic Committee.

On 30 August 2012 five paralympic athletes were inducted into the fourth Visa Paralympic Hall of Fame in a ceremony in London.

Criteria
Every two years, the prize is awarded to personalities Paralympic who have made outstanding contributions to success on and fair play, from the third edition of the award is sponsored by VISA.

Members

2006
 Jouko Grip
 Ulla Renvall (coach)
 Annemie Schneider

2008
 Connie Hansen
 Claudia Hengst
 Peter Homann
 André Viger
 Kevin McIntosh (coach)

2010
 Tanja Kari
 Chris Waddell
 Rolf Hettich (coach)

2012
 Louise Sauvage
 Trischa Zorn
 Roberto Marson
 Frank Ponta
 Chris Holmes

2014
 Jon Kreamelmeyer
 Eric Villalon Fuentes
 Verena Bentele

2016
 Junichi Kawai
 Chantal Petitclerc
 Franz Nietlispach
 Neroli Fairhall
 Martin Morse

Gallery

See also
Paralympic Games
List of multiple Paralympic gold medalists
Frank Ponta inducted into the Paralympic Hall of Fame
IPC inducts new members into its Hall of Fame

References

External links
Paralympic Hall of Fame at IPC web site
Paralympic Hall of Fame at IPC web site (old site)
Multi-Medallists at Internet Archive web site
 

Sports halls of fame
Awards established in 2006
Paralympic Games
Disabled sports awards
Halls of fame in Germany